Jeff Beck: Live at the B B King Blues Club is a live guitar instrumental album by Jeff Beck.  Although the material was recorded in 2003, the album was not released to the general public until 2006 (although it was available exclusively through Sony Music's online store in 2004).

Track listing
 "Roy's Toy"
 "Psychosam"
 "Big Block"
 "Freeway Jam"
 "Brush with the Blues"
 "Scatterbrain"
 "Goodbye Pork Pie Hat"
 "Nadia"
 "Savoy"
 "Angel (Footsteps)"
 "Seasons"
 "Where Were You"
 "You Never Know"
 "A Day in the Life"
 "People Get Ready"
 "My Thing"

Personnel
 Jeff Beck - guitar, bass guitar, special effects
Terry Bozzio - drums, percussion
Tony Hymas - keyboards, effects

Jeff Beck albums
2006 live albums